The Action of 22 September 1914 was an attack by the German U-boat  that took place during the First World War. Three obsolete Royal Navy cruisers, of the 7th Cruiser Squadron, manned mainly by Royal Naval Reserve part-time reservists and sometimes referred to as the Live Bait Squadron, were sunk by U-9 while patrolling the southern North Sea.

Neutral ships and trawlers nearby began to rescue survivors but 1,459 British sailors were killed. There was a public outcry in Britain at the losses. The sinkings eroded confidence in the British government and damaged the reputation of the Royal Navy, when many countries were still unsure about taking sides in the war.

Background
The force patrolled the North Sea, supporting destroyers and submarines of the Harwich Force to guard against incursions by the Imperial German Navy into the English Channel.

Though all three ships were less than 15 years old, they preceded a major shift in the technology of naval warships. Concerns had been expressed about the vulnerability of the ships against modern German cruisers but the War Orders of 28 July 1914, reflecting pre-war assumptions about attacks by destroyers rather than submarines, remained in force. The ships were to patrol the area "south of the 54th parallel clear of enemy torpedo craft and destroyers" supported by Cruiser Force C during the day. The Harwich Patrol guarded the Dogger Bank and the Broad Fourteens further south; usually cruisers were to the north closer to the Dogger Bank and sailed south at night. The cruisers moved to the Broad Fourteens to reinforce the fourth cruiser during troop movements from Britain to France. Heading south put the ships closer to German bases, more vulnerable to submarine attack.

Prelude

On 16 September, Christian had been allowed to keep two cruisers to the north and one at the Broad Fourteens but had kept them together in a central position, able to support operations in both areas. The next day, the destroyer escorts were forced to depart by heavy weather, which remained so bad that neither patrol could be reformed. The Admiralty ordered that the ships were to cancel the Dogger Patrol and cover the Broad Fourteens until the weather abated. On 20 September, Euryalus returned to port to re-coal and by 22 September, Aboukir, Hogue and Cressy were on patrol under the command of Captain J. E. Drummond of Aboukir. The U-boat was treated lightly by the Imperial German Navy; in the first six weeks of the war, the U-boat arm had sent out ten boats, sunk no ships and lost two boats for their efforts. On the morning of 22 September,  Otto Weddigen, the commander of  spotted Aboukir, Hogue and Cressy.

Action

Lookouts were posted for submarine periscopes or ships and one gun on each side of each ship was manned. U-9 had been ordered to attack British transports at Ostend but had been forced to dive and shelter from the storm. On surfacing, Weddigen spotted the British ships and moved to attack. No submarines had been sighted and Drummond, assuming that the ship had hit a mine, ordered the other two cruisers to close in to help. Aboukir capsized after 25 minutes and sank five minutes later. Only one lifeboat could be launched because of damage from the explosion and the failure of steam-powered winches needed to launch the others.

U-9, had dived after firing the torpedo, rose to periscope depth and Weddigen saw the other two cruisers rescuing men from Aboukir. As the torpedoes were fired, the bows of U-9 rose out of the water and she was spotted by Hogue, whose gunners opened fire before the submarine dived. The two torpedoes struck Hogue and within five minutes, Captain Wilmot Nicholson gave the order to abandon ship. Hogue capsized after ten minutes and sank at 07:15. Watchers on Cressy had seen the submarine, opened fire and made an abortive attempt to ram before turning to pick up survivors. A torpedo struck Cressy on the starboard side at around 07:25 and a second hit the port beam at 07:30. The ship capsized to starboard and floated upside down until 07:55.

Two Dutch sailing trawlers in the vicinity declined to close with Cressy for fear of mines. Distress calls had been received by Tyrwhitt, who, with the destroyer squadron, was already at sea returning to the cruisers now that the weather had improved. At 08:30, the Dutch steamship Flora approached the scene and rescued 286 men. Another steamer, Titan, picked up 147 men. More were rescued by the Lowestoft sailing trawlers, Coriander and J.G.C., before the destroyers arrived at 10:45. A total of 837 men were rescued but 62 officers and 1,397 men, many of them reservists, were killed. The dead included Robert Johnson, the captain of Cressy. The destroyers hunted the submarine, which had little electrical power remaining to travel underwater and could only make  on the surface. The submarine submerged for the night and returned to base the next day.

Aftermath

The disaster shook public confidence in Britain and the world in the Royal Navy. Other cruisers were withdrawn from patrol duties; Christian was reprimanded and Drummond was criticized by the Court of Inquiry for failing to take the anti-submarine precautions recommended by the Admiralty and praised for his conduct during the attack. The 28 officers and 258 men rescued by Flora were landed at IJmuiden and were repatriated on 26 September.

Wenman "Kit" Wykeham-Musgrave (1899–1989) survived being torpedoed on all three ships. His daughter recalled

Wykeham-Musgrave survived the war and rejoined the Royal Navy in 1939, reaching the rank of commander.

Weddigen and his crew returned to a heroes' welcome; Weddigen was awarded the Iron Cross, 1st Class and his crew each received the Iron Cross, 2nd Class. The sinking of the three ships caused the danger of U-boat attack to be taken more seriously by the Admiralty. Commander Dudley Pound, serving in the Grand Fleet as a commander aboard the battleship  (who became First Sea Lord) wrote in his diary on 24 September,

In 1954, the British government sold the salvage rights to the ships and work began in 2011.

Order of battle

Royal Navy
 , armoured cruiser, flagship
 , armoured cruiser
 , armoured cruiser

German Navy
 , submarine

Notes

Footnotes

References

Books
 
 
 
 
 
 
 
Journals
 

Websites

External links
 Loss of HMS Aboukir, Cressy and Hogue

North Sea operations of World War I
Naval battles of World War I involving the United Kingdom
Naval battles of World War I involving Germany
Conflicts in 1914
September 1914 events